Rafael Alarcón (born 5 August 1958) is a Mexican professional golfer who played on the PGA Tour.

Early life
Alarcón was born and raised in Guadalajara, Jalisco, Mexico, playing golf from young age at Guadalajara Country Club, one of the oldest golf clubs in Mexico.

Amateur career
He played on two NCAA Division I Championship winning teams, 1976 and 1978, and was a three-time All-American while attending Oklahoma State University. In 1976 he lost in a playoff to Jim Nelford at the Canadian Amateur Championship. In 1977, he was runner-up at the Western Amateur, losing in the final. Three years after his playoff loss at the Canadian Amateur, he won the championship at Brantford Golf Club, Ontario, and another important amateur tournament in North America, the Southern Amateur at the Country Club of North Carolina, Pinehurst.

Alarcón represented Mexico three times in the Eisenhower Trophy, the first time in 1974 at age 16. In 1980, at Pinehurst Country Club, North Carolina, the Mexican team finished 9th.

Professional career 
Alarcón turned professional after the 1980 amateur season and played in North and South America, Europe and Asia. In 1981, he finished runner-up to Tim Simpson at the unofficial European Tour approved event Cacharel World Under-25 Championship in Nimes, France.

His first professional win abroad came in 1984 at the Indian Open on the Asia Golf Circuit.

Alarcón qualified for the 1983 PGA Tour season. Alarcón never won on the PGA Tour, to match Cesar Sanudo and Victor Regalado, who, at the time of Alarcon's active career, were the only native Mexican golfers to have done so. Alarcón's best finish was tied 19th at the 1997 Kemper Open.

Two years in a row, 1995 and 1996, Alarcón finished runner-up in a tournament on the American second-tier Nike Tour, later named the Korn Ferry Tour, namely the Nike Monterrey Open, played in his home country of Mexico. In 1995, winner Stuart Appleby needed seven extra playoff holes to beat Alarcón.

Alarcón won the 1990 Mexican PGA Championship and led the Mexican PGA Tour in earnings 1989−1992.

Alarcón represented Mexico seven times in the World Cup and twice in the Dunhill Cup. In the 1995 World Cup of Golf at Mission Hills Golf Club in Shenzhen, China, the Mexico team of Alarcón and Esteban Toledo finished tied 10th, eight strokes from second place.

On 1 December 1997, Alarcón won the Compaq World Putting Championship by Dave Pelz at the Bonnett Creek Golf Club at Walt Disney World in Orlando, Florida. He beat Spike McRoy on the second sudden-death playoff hole, winning a first prize of $250,000. Second prize was $50,000.

At 43 years of age, in 2001, Alarcon won the Venezuela Open on the Tour de las Américas.

Private life, awards
After mainly retiring from competition play in 1997, Alarcón made a few tournament appearances in Latin America and worked as a coach for Lorena Ochoa. When Ochoa, also a Guadalajara native, was 11 years old, she approached Alarcón and asked him to coach her. During his time as her coach, she won 27 LPGA Tour titles, including two majors and reached number one on the Women's World Golf Rankings, before she retired at 28 years of age. After her retirement, he has been coaching at Lorena Ochoa's Golf Academy.

Alarcón also worked as a golf course designer, together with Carter Morrish at Alarcon Morrish Golf Course Design.

Alarcón was appointed Jalisco State Golfer of the Century. He was awarded the National Prize for Sports, received on 20 November 2009 from the President of Mexico during a ceremony at the official presidential residence.

Amateur wins
1976 Mexican Junior
1977 Mexican Amateur
1978 Mexican Amateur
1979 Canadian Amateur Championship, Southern Amateur
1980 Big Eight Individual

Professional wins (3)

Asia Golf Circuit wins (1)

Tour de las Américas wins (1)

Other wins (1)
1990 Mexican PGA Championship

Playoff record
Nike Tour playoff record (0–1)

Results in major championships 

CUT = missed the half-way cut
"T" = tied
Note: Alarcón only played in the U.S. Open.

Team appearances 
Amateur
Eisenhower Trophy (representing Mexico): 1974, 1976, 1980

Professional
World Cup (representing Mexico): 1988, 1991, 1994, 1995, 1996, 1997, 1999
Dunhill Cup (representing Mexico): 1990, 1993

See also
1982 PGA Tour Qualifying School graduates
1996 PGA Tour Qualifying School graduates

References

External links

Mexican male golfers
Oklahoma State Cowboys golfers
PGA Tour golfers
Sportspeople from Guadalajara, Jalisco
1958 births
Living people
20th-century Mexican people